Articles related to children's rights include:



A

 Abandonment - when a parent, guardian, or person in charge of a child either deserts a child without any regard for the child's physical health, safety or welfare and with the intention of wholly abandoning the child, or in some instances, fails to provide necessary care for a child living under their roof.
 Adultcentrism - The exaggerated egocentrism of adults.
 Adultism - A predisposition towards adults, which some see as biased against children, youth, and all young people who aren't addressed or viewed as adults.
 ADHD - A persistent pattern of inattention and/or hyperactivity, as well as forgetfulness, poor impulse control or impulsivity, and distractibility. 
 Age of consent - The minimum age at which a person is considered to be capable of legally giving informed consent to any contract or behaviour regulated by law with another person. 
 Age of criminal responsibility - The age after which the defense of infancy is no longer an excuse.
 Age of majority - The threshold of adulthood as it is conceptualized in law. 
 Anorexia nervosa - A psychiatric diagnosis that describes an eating disorder characterized by low body weight and body image distortion with an obsessive fear of gaining weight.

B

 Best interests
 Breastfeeding
 Bullying

C
 Children's Rights Education
 Child migration
 Child protection
 Child-selling
 Child soldiers
 Circumcision
 Child labor laws in the United States
 Child Labour

D

 Decision making

E

 Education
 Evolving capacities

F

 Family rights
 Fathers' rights movement
 Fear of childbirth
 Fear of children
 Fetal rights
 Freedom of expression
 Freedom of speech
 Freedom of thought

G

 Genital integrity
 Genital mutilation

H

 Health care
 Healthy diet
 Homelessness

I

 Incarceration
 Infanticide
 Infant oral mutilation, practiced in Africa
 International child abduction
 International child abduction in Brazil
 International child abduction in Japan
 International child abduction in Mexico
 International child abduction in the United States
 Inter-Agency Guiding Principles on Unaccompanied and Separated Children

J

 Juvenile court

M

 Maternity rights
 Military use of children

P

 Parental alienation
 Parents' rights movement
 Paternity fraud
 Paternity rights
 Paternity testing
 Play
 Pregnant patients' rights

R

 Reproductive rights
 Right to be heard
 Right to work
 Residential treatment center

S

 Shaken baby syndrome
 Smoking
 Standard of living
 Student rights

T

 Teen courts
 Teenage pregnancy
 Trafficking of children
 Transnational child protection

U
 United States
 Unaccompanied minor

V
 Verdingkinder - Swiss children taken away from their impoverished parents, usually to work on farms as slave labor and often mistreated.

Y

 Youth participation
 Youth rights
 Youth suicide
 Youth suffrage
 Youth voice
 Wage labour

See also
 Children's rights movement
Timeline of children's rights in the United States
Timeline of children's rights in the United Kingdom
 Children's rights law
Child labor laws in the United States
 List of international and European law on child protection and migration

References

Legal doctrines and principles
Child custody
Child welfare
Children's rights
Family law
Human migration
Social work